Brokenhead was a provincial electoral division in the Canadian province of Manitoba. It was created by redistribution in 1957 from part of Winnipeg North, and formally came into existence in the provincial election of 1958. The electoral district was last contested in the 1966 Manitoba general election, after which it was abolished.

Electoral results

1958 general election

1959 general election

1962 general election

1966 general election

References

Former provincial electoral districts of Manitoba